The 1996–97 Valparaiso Crusaders men's basketball team represented Valparaiso University during the 1996–97 NCAA Division I men's basketball season. The Crusaders, led by ninth-year head coach Homer Drew, played their home games at the Athletics–Recreation Center as members of the Mid-Continent Conference. The Crusaders won Mid-Con regular season and tournament titles, and received an automatic bid to the NCAA tournament as No. 12 seed in the West region. In the opening round, Valpo was beaten by No. 5 seed Boston College, 73–66. The team finished with a record of 24–7 (13–3 Mid-Con).

Roster

Schedule and results

|-
!colspan=9 style=| Regular season

|-
!colspan=12 style=| Mid-Con tournament

|-
!colspan=12 style=| NCAA tournament

Source

References

Valparaiso
Valparaiso Beacons men's basketball seasons
Valparaiso
Valparaiso Crusaders men's basketball
Valparaiso Crusaders men's basketball